Sick of It All is a New York hardcore band formed in 1986 and currently consists of brothers Lou Koller (vocals) and Pete Koller (guitar), Armand Majidi (drums) and Craig Setari (bass guitar). In the  years since its inception, the band has released twelve studio albums, two live recordings, two compilation albums, two EPs, six singles and one documentary film.

After recording a demo in 1987 and playing Sunday afternoon matinees at the famous CBGB's, Sick of It All signed a record contract with Revelation Records, who released a self-titled 7-inch EP. In 1988, the band terminated their contract with Revelation and signed with the now-defunct Relativity Records, who released their first two studio albums as well as a live EP. In 1993, they ended their five-year tenure with Relativity and signed with East West Records. In 1998, Sick of It All terminated their U.S. record contract for the fourth time and signed with Fat Wreck Chords. Around 2005, they ended their seven-year tenure with Fat Wreck and signed to Abacus Recordings, who released one album for the band before the label went bankrupt; they would remain signed to Abacus' parent label Century Media, until 2018 when they resigned to Fat Wreck Chords.

Full-length albums

EPs/singles

Other releases

Guest appearances
 Barcode - Course of Action (feat. Lou Koller)
 Born from Pain - Doomsday Clock (feat. Lou Koller)
 CIV - Can't Wait One Minute More (feat. Lou Koller)
 Devil in Me - Back Against The Wall (feat. Lou Koller & Craig Setari, both on vocals)
 Ensign - 15 Years (feat. Lou Koller)
 H2O - Fairweather Friend (feat. Lou Koller and Kevin Seconds of 7 Seconds)
 H2O - What Happened? (feat. Lou Koller and Matt Skiba of Alkaline Trio)
 King Ly Chee - Lost in a World (feat. Lou Koller)
 Mobb Deep - Survival of the Fittest (feat. Sick of It All)
 Most Precious Blood - It Runs In The Blood (feat. Lou Koller)
 Skarhead - T.C.O.B. (feat. Craig Setari)
 Super Junky Monkey - If (feat. Lou Koller)
The Bones - I Wanna Be Sedated (Ramones cover) (feat. Lou Koller and Roger Miret of Agnostic Front)
The Haunted - Who Will Decide (feat. Lou Koller)
 The Warriors - Mankind Screams (feat. Lou Koller)

Videos
 The Story So Far (2001)

Music videos
 "Injustice System"
 "Just Look Around"
 "Scratch the Surface"
 "Step Down"
 "Us vs. Them"
 "Potential for a Fall"
 "District"
 "Relentless"
 "Take the Night Off"
 "Death or Jail"
 "Road Less Traveled"
 "Get Bronx"

References

Sick of It All discography
Discographies of American artists